The 26th Annual Tony Awards was broadcast by ABC television on April 23, 1972, from The Broadway Theatre in New York City. Hosts were Henry Fonda, Deborah Kerr and Peter Ustinov.

The ceremony
Presenters were Richard Benjamin, Ingrid Bergman, Claire Bloom, Arlene Dahl, Sandy Duncan, Peter Falk, Lee Grant, Joel Grey, Arthur Hill, Hal Holbrook, Jean Stapleton, and Gwen Verdon.

Performers were Desi Arnaz, Janet Blair, Larry Blyden, Alfred Drake, Helen Gallagher, Lisa Kirk, Hal Linden, Barbara McNair, Ethel Merman, and Constance Towers.

Musicals represented:
 Ain't Supposed to Die a Natural Death ("Put a Curse on You" - Company)
 Jesus Christ Superstar (Medley - Jeff Fenholt, Yvonne Elliman and Company)
 No, No, Nanette ("You Can Dance With Any Girl" - Helen Gallagher and Bobby Van / "I Want to Be Happy" - Ruby Keeler and Company)

Special Tony Awards were presented to Ethel Merman and Richard Rodgers.  For Rodgers, there was a medley from his works, from Garrick Gaieties to Do I Hear A Waltz, with the composer accepting his award to the tune of "The Sound of Music."  With the assistance of Hal Linden and Larry Blyden, Merman herself sang selections from her performances, including "I Got Rhythm" and "Everything's Comin' Up Roses."

Winners and nominees
Winners are in bold

Special awards
The Theatre Guild—American Theatre Society, for its many years of service to audiences for touring shows.
Fiddler on the Roof, on becoming the longest-running musical in Broadway history. Presented to Harold Prince
Ethel Merman
Richard Rodgers

Multiple nominations and awards

These productions had multiple nominations:

11 nominations: Follies 
9 nominations: Two Gentlemen of Verona
7 nominations: Ain't Supposed to Die a Natural Death and Grease 
5 nominations: Jesus Christ Superstar and Old Times
4 nominations: Sticks and Bones and Vivat! Vivat Regina! 
3 nominations: A Funny Thing Happened on the Way to the Forum and The Prisoner of Second Avenue 
2 nominations: Lenny    

The following productions received multiple awards.

7 wins: Follies  
2 wins: A Funny Thing Happened on the Way to the Forum, The Prisoner of Second Avenue, Sticks and Bones and Two Gentlemen of Verona

References

External links
Tony Awards Official Site

Tony Awards ceremonies
1972 in theatre
1972 awards
1972 awards in the United States
Tony Awards
1970s in Manhattan